Short Line is also one of the four railroads in the American version of the popular board game Monopoly,  named after the Shore Fast Line, an interurban streetcar line.

A shortline railroad is a small or mid-sized railroad company that operates over a relatively short distance relative to larger, national railroad networks. The term is used primarily in the United States and Canada. In the U.S., railroads are categorized by operating revenue, and most shortline railroads fall into the Class III or Class II categorization defined by the Surface Transportation Board.
Shortlines generally exist for one of three reasons: to link two industries requiring rail freight together (for example, a gypsum mine and a wall board factory, or a coal mine and a power plant); to interchange revenue traffic with other, usually larger, railroads; or to operate a tourist passenger train service.  Often, short lines exist for all three of these reasons.

History
At the beginning of the railroad age, nearly all railway lines were shortlines, locally chartered, financed and operated;  as the railroad industry matured, local lines were merged or acquired to create longer mainline railroads.

Especially since 1980 in the U.S. and 1990 in Canada, many shortlines have been established when larger railroad companies sold off or abandoned low-profit portions of their trackage. Shortline operators typically have lower labor, overhead and regulatory costs than Class I railroads and therefore are often able to operate profitable lines that lost money for their original owners.

Classification
Because of their small size and generally low revenues, the great majority of shortline railroads in the U.S. are classified by the Association of American Railroads as Class III. As defined by the Surface Transportation Board, a Class III is a railroad with an annual operating revenue of less than $28 million.  In Canada, Transport Canada classifies short line railroads as Class II.

There are three kinds of shortlines in the U.S.:  handling, switch, and ISS (Interline Settlement System).
 Handling shortlines exist only to move cars along their tracks for larger railroads.  They are not listed in the route on a railcar's waybill.  Handling short lines may have compensation agreements with the larger railroads they serve that do not depend on per car rates.
 Switch shortlines are similar to handling shortlines except that they are listed on a railcar's route, and they collect a fee for each car they move on their tracks.
 ISS shortlines operate the same as Class I and II railroads.  They are included in the routes of railcars.  Also, they serve as the billing railroads for loads that originate on their lines.  For loads not originating on their lines, ISS shortlines still collect a portion of the freight rate.

Impact of consolidation
An ever-growing number of shortline operators have been acquired by larger holding companies which own or lease railroad properties in many states, as well as internationally.  For example, "Genesee & Wyoming Inc." (AAR Rep. Mark "GEXR") at this writing controls 113 railroads in 42 US States and 4 Canadian provinces. A necessary and direct consequence of this is that "shortline railroads" may no longer be "by state."

Statistics

It was reported in 2009 that short-line railroads employ 20,000 people in the U.S., and own 30 percent of the nation's railroad tracks. About a quarter of all U.S. rail freight travels at least a small part of its journey over a short-line railroad.

In other countries 

See also
 Class I railroad
 Class II railroad
 List of U.S. railroads
 List of Canadian railroads
 List of Mexican railroads
 Switching and terminal railroad

References

External links
American Short Line and Regional Railroad Association

Railway companies